The 2019 Incarnate Word Cardinals football team represented the University of the Incarnate Word (UIW) in the 2019 NCAA Division I FCS football season as a member of the Southland Conference. The Cardinals played their home games at Gayle and Tom Benson Stadium in San Antonio, Texas. They were led by second-year head coach Eric Morris. They finished the season 5–7, 4–5 in Southland play to finish in a tie for 6th place.

Previous season
The Cardinals finished the 2018 season 6–5, 6–2 in Southland play to win a share of the Southland Conference championship. They received an at-large bid to the FCS Playoffs, where they lost in the first round to Montana State.

Preseason

Preseason All-Conference Teams
On July 11, 2019, the Southland Conference announced their Preseason All-Conference Teams, with the Cardinals having five players selected.

Offense First Team
 OL Brandon Floores – Senior
 OL Terence Hickman II – Senior

Offense Second Team
 QB Jon Copeland – Sophomore
 OL Uzoma Okere – Junior
 P David Balcomb – Senior

Preseason Poll
On July 18, 2019, the Southland announced their preseason poll, with the Cardinals predicted to finish in third place. UIW also received one first place vote.

Schedule
UIW announced its 2019 football schedule on February 13, 2019. The schedule consists of 6 home games and 6 away games.
Source:

Personnel

Coaching staff
Source:

Roster
Source:

Depth chart

Postseason honors
The following Cardinals received postseason honors for the 2019 season:

All–Southland Conference Third–Team
OL  Terence Hickman II – Senior
OL  Brandon Floores – Senior
LB  Kelechi Anyalebechi – Sophomore
DB  Jaylon Jimmerson – Freshman

Game summaries

@ UTSA

Texas Southern

@ Sam Houston State

Abilene Christian

@ Houston Baptist

@ Southeastern Louisiana

Lamar

Northwestern State

Nicholls

@ Stephen F. Austin

@ New Mexico State

Central Arkansas

Rankings

References

Incarnate Word
Incarnate Word Cardinals football seasons
Incarnate Word Cardinals football